The Tim Taylor Award is an award given out to the NCAA Division I player judged to be the most outstanding freshman. The annual award was first received by Andreas Nödl after the conclusion of the 2006–07 season.

Shortly after his succumbing to cancer, the NCAA renamed the 'National Rookie of the Year Award' after long-time Yale head coach Tim Taylor. Starting in 2013–14 the honor was renamed the 'Tim Taylor Award'. ECAC Hockey already confers an award with the same name, given each year to the conference Coach of the Year. It was renamed in Taylor's honor in 2007.

Winners

Winners by school

Winners by position

References

College sports freshman awards
Tim Taylor Award
Ice Hockey National Rookie of the Year
NCAA Division I ice hockey
Yale Bulldogs men's ice hockey
2006 establishments in the United States
Awards established in 2006